Măldărești is a commune located in Vâlcea County, Oltenia, Romania. It is composed of four villages: Măldărești, Măldăreștii de Jos, Roșoveni and Telechești.

References

Communes in Vâlcea County
Localities in Oltenia